Craig Piligian (born August 25, 1957) is an Armenian American television producer, and the President and CEO of Pilgrim Films & Television. As an Executive Producer, he is best known for creating The Ultimate Fighter, American Chopper and Dirty Jobs series for Discovery Channel. In 2001, he won an Emmy Award as co-executive producer of Survivor.

In November 2003, Piligian began producing Dirty Jobs, a series on the Discovery channel that focused on blue-collar jobs. The show ran for eight years and aired over 170 episodes. The show ended in 2012.

In 2004, Piligian worked with Dana White and Lorenzo Fertitta to bring a reality show about boxers, called The Ultimate Fighter, to television. The reality series followed sixteen fighters that lived in a house and competed for a UFC contract. 

In 2012, Piligian was 18th on The Hollywood Reporter's "50 Most Powerful List".

In 2015, Lionsgate purchased a major stake in Piligian's Pilgrim Studios for $200 million.

In March 2016, Piligian partnered with Ben Affleck and Matt Damon to create The Runner, an original series about mobile devices for streaming on mobile devices through the streaming service go90. In 2018, Piligian worked with Roger Ross Williams to develop High on the Hog, a docuseries depicting African American history through the lens of food, based on Dr. Jessica B. Harris’ book High on the Hog: A Culinary Journey from Africa to America.

In April 2021, Piligian was named chair of Pilgrim Media Group and president.

Personal life 
He is married to Lucinda Dickey; they have two children, Joseph Michael (b. 1986) and Amanda Marie (b. 1989). In 2016, Piligian purchased a historical ranch property in Kansas for $5.325 million.

References

External links

Pilgrim Studios homepage

Living people
Businesspeople from Michigan
American television producers
1957 births